Michael David Fields is an American film and television director.

He has directed episodes of Veronica Mars, Law & Order: Special Victims Unit, Law & Order: Criminal Intent, Third Watch, Gossip Girl, Homicide: Life on the Street, Sex and the City, Roswell, Melrose Place, and iZombie, among other series.

He also wrote and directed the 1985 television adaptation of Noon Wine for the PBS anthology series American Playhouse. In 1990, he directed his first and only theatrical film  Bright Angel.

Fields is a graduate of Wesleyan University.

References

External links
 

American film directors
American television directors
American television producers
Wesleyan University alumni
Living people
Place of birth missing (living people)
Year of birth missing (living people)